Rohan Bijesh Banerjee (born 10 December 1988) is an Indian cricketer. He plays for Bengal and Kolkata Knight Riders, Indian Premier League 2008. He is an opening batsman.

On his first-class debut for Bengal against Services he scored 176.

References

External links
CricketArchive

1988 births
Living people
Indian cricketers
Bengal cricketers
People from North 24 Parganas district
Heramba Chandra College alumni
University of Calcutta alumni